Vienneau is a surname. Notable people with the surname include: 

David Vienneau (1951–2004), Canadian journalist
Jim Vienneau (born 1926), American music producer
Jocelyne Roy-Vienneau (1956–2019), Lieutenant Governor of New Brunswick, Canada